A commune is an alternative term for an intentional community. Commune or comună or comune or other derivations may also refer to:

Administrative-territorial entities
 Commune (administrative division), a municipality or township
 Communes of Angola
 Communes of Belgium
 Communes of Benin
 Communes of Burundi
 Communes of Chile
 Communes of the Democratic Republic of the Congo
 Communes of France
 Communes of Italy, called comune
 Communes of Luxembourg
 Communes of Moldova, called comună
 Communes of Romania, called comună
 Communes of Switzerland
 Commune-level subdivisions (Vietnam)
 Commune (Vietnam)
 Commune-level town (Vietnam)
 People's commune, highest of three administrative levels in rural China, 1958 to 1983

Government and military/defense
 Agricultural commune, intentional community based on agricultural labor
 Commune (rebellion), a synonym for uprising or revolutionary government
 Paris Commune (1789–1795), the government of Paris from 1792 until 1795
 Paris Commune (1871), a radical socialist and revolutionary government that ruled Paris from 18 March to 28 May 1871
 Lyon Commune (1870–1871)
 Besançon Commune (1871)
 Strandzha Commune (1903)
 Morelos Commune (c. 1913–1917)
 Medieval commune, a form of mutual defense alliance

Arts, entertainment, and media

Films
 La Commune (Paris, 1871), a 2000 French film 
 Commune (film), a 2005 documentary about Black Bear Ranch narrated by Peter Coyote
 The Commune, a 2016 Danish film

Music
 Commune (album) by Goat  2014
 Commune, a 2003 album by Japanese singer Yuki Isoya

Other uses in arts, entertainment, and media
 Comunes Collective, a non-profit organization
 Commune FC, a football club in Burkina Faso
 The Commune, anarchist newspaper published by Guy Aldred
 The commune, a book by Margaret Buckley (published in 1992 by Chrysalis Press in the UK)

See also
 Communis (disambiguation)
 Kommune (disambiguation)